The Chinese Unification Promotion Party, also known as the Unionist Party, is a political party in Taiwan that promotes Chinese unification.

History 

On 9 May 2004, Taiwanese gangster Chang An-lo established the NGO "Defending China's Great Alliance" in Guangzhou, China, with the help of the Bamboo Union triad (who he was formerly a leader of). Chang then helped register the Taiwan branch of his organization as a political party on 9 September 2005, under the name "Chinese Unification Promotion Party".

In 2017, the party claimed to have over 30,000 members, many of whom were accused by authorities of having ties to organized crime, something Chang himself does not deny. Other sources have put their membership at approximately 60,000.

Controversies
The controversy about the China Unification Promotion Party mainly revolves around its pro-Chinese Communist Party position, intimidating pro-democracy activists from Hong Kong and Pan-Green Coalition leaders in Taiwan, using the triad background of their members.

Attack on Lam Wing-kee 
Lam Wing-kee, the owner of Causeway Bay Books, announced in September 2019 that he planned to re-open the store in Taiwan. The store focuses on the history, social economy and other cultural related books of Hong Kong, Taiwan, and Mainland China. The store publishes the works of dissident creators, and serve as a connection and mutual assistance base for people in Taiwan and Hong Kong, dedicated to preserving Hong Kong culture and promoting the free exchange of ideas and culture.

On 21 April 2020, Lam was splashed with paint by unidentified men while dining at a café. The Mainland Affairs Council posted on Facebook stating that Taiwan is a democratic country and cannot tolerate such behaviors. A self-proclaimed member of the Unionist Party left a message under the post, reading, "This is just our first warning to you, [we will] kill you in a matter of minutes" (這只是我們對你的第一次警告，搞死你分鐘的事). The New Power Party responded to the incident by urging the Taiwan government to dissolve and ban the Unionist Party. They also referred to the previous assaults against Joshua Wong, Denise Ho and other Hong Kong democrats conducted by members of Unionist Party, and criticized the government for its inaction.

Notes

See also 

 United Front in Taiwan

References

External links 

 

2005 establishments in Taiwan
Anti-Japanese sentiment in Taiwan
Political parties established in 2005
Conservative parties in Taiwan
Far-right politics in Taiwan
Organized crime groups in Taiwan
Organizations associated with the Chinese Communist Party
Chinese nationalist political parties